Seymour Bernstein (born April 24, 1927) is an American pianist, composer, and teacher. He is the subject of the documentary Seymour: An Introduction directed by the actor Ethan Hawke. Hawke describes Bernstein as a mentor figure.

Biography
Bernstein was born and raised in Newark, New Jersey, where he graduated from Weequahic High School in 1945. He began teaching piano at the age of fifteen, when his teacher at the time, Clara Husserl, a pupil of Theodor Leschetizky, arranged for him to supervise the practicing of some of her gifted younger pupils. He soon had a class of pupils of his own. He achieved local fame as a performer, winning the Griffith Artist Award at the age of seventeen. During the Korean War, he gave concerts on the front lines and for military leaders. His concert career took him to Europe, Asia, and many parts of the Americas, and he wrote With Your Own Two Hands and 20 Lessons in Keyboard Choreography, which have been published in German, Japanese, Korean, and Russian.

Bernstein studied with Alexander Brailowsky, Clifford Curzon, Jan Gorbaty, Nadia Boulanger, and George Enescu. In 1969 he made his debut with the Chicago Symphony Orchestra, playing the world premiere of Heitor Villa-Lobos's Concerto No. 2. He is the winner of the First Prize and Prix Jacques Durand at Fontainebleau, the National Federation of Music Clubs Award for Furthering American Music Abroad, a Beebe Foundation grant, two Martha Baird Rockefeller grants, and four State Department grants.  He made a point of offering master classes and lecture recitals where his concert tours took him. When grant money allowed, he filled his suitcases with scores to distribute to teachers and students. He ceased performing in 1977, in order to concentrate on teaching, composing and other creative outlets; he told no one that his farewell recital would be his last.

Bernstein has composed music ranging from teaching material for students of all levels to sophisticated concert pieces. He performs as a guest artist with chamber ensembles and serves on the juries of  international competitions. He maintains a private studio in New York City and is also an Adjunct Associate Professor of Music and Music Education at New York University. On December 18, 2004, he was awarded an honorary doctorate from Shenandoah University. In 2015, actor and filmmaker Ethan Hawke made a documentary about Bernstein entitled: "Seymour: An Introduction".

Bibliography

References

External links
 
 
 
 Seymour Bernstein Interview NAMM Oral History Library (2021)

1927 births
Living people
Musicians from Newark, New Jersey
Weequahic High School alumni
American classical pianists
American male classical pianists
Steinhardt School of Culture, Education, and Human Development faculty
20th-century classical pianists
21st-century classical pianists
Jewish classical pianists
20th-century American pianists
21st-century American pianists
Classical musicians from New York (state)
Classical musicians from New Jersey
20th-century American male musicians
21st-century American male musicians